The 2012 Valley First Crown of Curling was held from October 19 to 22 at the Kamloops Curling Club in Kamloops, British Columbia as part of the 2012–13 World Curling Tour. For both the men's and women's events, the event was held in a triple knockout format, and the purses for the men's and women's events were CAD$34,000 each, of which the winners, Brent Pierce and Wang Bingyu, received CAD$8,000 each.

In the men's final, Pierce defeated Jamie King in the final in an extra end with a score of 7–6, while in the women's final, Wang defeated Lene Nielsen with a score of 6–4.

Men

Teams
The teams are listed as follows:

Knockout results
The draw is listed as follows:

A event

B event

C event

Playoffs

Women

Teams
The teams are listed as follows:

Knockout results
The draw is listed as follows:

A event

B event

C event

Playoffs

References

External links

2012 in Canadian curling
Sport in Kamloops
Curling in British Columbia